= Shivtar =

Village in Maharashtra

- Village
- Interactive map of Shivtar
- Country: India
- State: Maharashtra

Shivtar is a huge village in Ratnagiri district, Maharashtra state in Western India. The 2011 Census of India recorded a total of 649 residents in the village. Shivtar's geographical area is approximately 1,025 hectares (2,530 acres).
